The Rolls-Royce BR700 family of turbofan engines for regional jets and corporate jets. It was developed by BMW and Rolls-Royce plc through the joint venture BMW Rolls-Royce AeroEngines GmbH, established in 1990. The BR710 first ran in 1995. It is manufactured in Dahlewitz, Germany. Rolls-Royce took full control of the company in 2000, which is now known as Rolls-Royce Deutschland. The military designation of the series is F130.

Design and development

BR710

The BR710 is a twin shaft turbofan, and entered service on the Gulfstream V in 1997 and the Bombardier Global Express in 1998. This version has also been selected to power the Gulfstream G550.

The BR710 comprises a  diameter single-stage fan, driven by a two-stage LP turbine, supercharging a ten-stage HP compressor (scaled from the V2500 unit) and driven by a two-stage, air-cooled, HP turbine.

In May 2017, the 3,200 engines in service reached 10 million flying hours.

Another rerated version, with a revised exhaust system, was selected for the now-cancelled Royal Air Force Nimrod MRA4s.

BR715

The BR715 is another twin-shaft turbofan; this engine was first run in April 1997 and entered service in mid-1999. This version powers the Boeing 717.

A new LP spool, comprising a  diameter single-stage fan, with two-stage LP compressor driven by a three-stage LP turbine, is incorporated into the BR715. The HP spool is similar to that of the BR710.

The IP compressor booster stages supercharge the core, increasing core power and thereby net thrust. However, a larger fan is required, to keep the specific thrust low enough to satisfy jet noise considerations.

BR725

The BR725 is a variant of the BR710 to power the Gulfstream G650.
Its prototype underwent component bench and its first full engine run in spring 2008. 
European certification was achieved in June 2009.
The first Gulfstream G650, with BR725 engines, was delivered in December 2011.

The  fan with 24 swept blades is  larger than the BR710. The HP axial compressor benefits from three-dimensional aerodynamics for greater efficiency and has 10 stages including five blisks to reduce weight.
The BR715 inspired combustor yields a longer life and lower emissions: 80% lower smoke and unburned hydrocarbons and 35% lower NOx than CAEP 6 limits.
The two-stage HP turbine has blade active tip-clearance control for more efficiency; 3D aerodynamics reduce the cooling air flow. The LP turbine has three stages instead of two.
The BR725 has a bypass ratio of 4.2:1 and is 4 dB quieter than the predecessor BR710.

On 24 September 2021 the USAF selected the F130, rejecting proposals from GE Aviation and Pratt & Whitney. The USAF intends to purchase 650 engines (608 direct replacements, 42 spare engines) for its fleet of 76 B-52H aircraft in a $2.6 billion deal. The CERP engines will be built at Rolls-Royce North America's Indianapolis, Indiana, plant.

Future developments
The Advance 2 development effort inserts new, advanced technology into existing  class BR710 and the larger BR725 engines. An even larger engine will also be made, with a  fan. The BR710 and BR715 main developments, the next generation of  engines to be introduced in the 2020s, will have an Advance 3 core, improved engine health management, newer materials, and cooling. They will also have a “blisk” fan made out of titanium, with an overall pressure ratio of 50:1. These improvements will yield a 10% thrust specific fuel consumption reduction, 50% NOx margin improvement, 99.995% reliability, and a 20% better thrust-to-weight ratio.

Pearl 15

The Pearl engine was developed in Dahlewitz from the BR700 with Advance2 technologies.
EASA certification was applied for on 28 February 2015.
It made its first ground run in 2015, type tests in 2016, and flight tests in 2017.
Six test engines logged over 6,000 cycles on 2,000 test hours.
The test program included lightning strike, water ingestion, ice, and -40 °C cold-start testing.

EASA certification was granted on 28 February 2018 and it was unveiled on 28 May 2018.
It was undergoing flight tests in May 2018 for an end of 2019 planned entry into service aboard the Bombardier Global Express 5500 and 6500 developments.
It should have logged 10,000 hours by then.

Its layout is similar to the BR725, with the same stage count and 24 titanium fan blades.
Its fan has a  diameter.
The enhanced 3-stage  turbine with advanced high temperature materials, advanced segments and seals allow for higher pressures and temperatures and the new low emissions cooled combustor includes a new tiled combustion chamber.
Its core uses advanced nickel alloys and ceramic coatings, includes a new 10-stage  compressor with 6 titanium blisks and a new 2-stage HP turbine with enhanced aerodynamics and blade cooling, enhanced segments and seals.

Its overall pressure ratio attains 43:1 and its bypass ratio 4.8:1.
The HP compressor ratio rises to 24:1.
Health monitoring should improve on the BR710 99.97% dispatch reliability which is logging one unplanned engine removal per 100,000 hours while the BR715 is approaching zero unplanned removals.

Pearl 700

The Pearl 700 will power the Gulfstream G700, a stretch of the previous G650.
Evolved from the BR725 with a similar architecture plus a fourth low-pressure turbine stage and a  larger,  blisk fan, its bypass ratio is higher than 6.5:1 and its overall pressure ratio should exceed 50:1.
It should provide  of thrust, 3-5% better thrust specific fuel consumption than the BR725 variant powering the Gulfstream G650, reduced emissions and lower noise.

Pearl 10X

The upcoming Dassault Falcon 10X will be powered by two Pearl 10X engines over  thrust, with a titanium fan blisk, a 10-stage  compressor, a two-stage shroudless HP turbine and a four-stage  turbine.
The initial Pearl 10X test engine was first run in early 2022 and the programme had accumulated 1,000h of testing by May, along with the Advance2 demonstrator.
The Advance2 core and new low-pressure system allows 5% more efficiency than the previous Rolls-Royce business jet engines.

Variants

BR700-710A1-10
BR700-710A2-20
BR700-710B3-40
Variant with a  takeoff rating for the BAE Systems Nimrod MRA4.
BR700-710C4-11
BR700-710D5-21
BR700-715A1-30
Variant with a   takeoff rating for Boeing 717-200 basic gross weight variants.
BR700-715B1-30
Variant with an   takeoff rating.
BR700-715C1-30
Variant with a   takeoff rating for Boeing 717-200 high gross weight variants.
BR700-725A1-12
F130
Military variant of the BR700-725 with a  maximum rating for the Boeing B-52 Stratofortress.
BR700-TP

The BR715 thrust ratings can be adjusted by changing a plug in the FADEC controller, meaning no engine change is required.  The A1-30 can become a C1-30 with a simple plug and software change.

Applications

 BAE Systems Nimrod MRA4
 Bombardier Global Express
 Boeing 717
 Boeing B-52H Stratofortress (F130 variant)
 Dassault Falcon 10X
 Gulfstream V
 Gulfstream G550
 Gulfstream G650/G700
 Rekkof/Fokker XF70/XF100
 Tupolev Tu-334

Specifications

See also

References

External links

 BR700: Technical data
 BR710: Power for ultra-long range business jets and special mission aircraft
 

High-bypass turbofan engines
1990s turbofan engines